Sang Sarak may refer to:
 Sang Sarak, Gilan
 Sang Sarak, Mazandaran
 Sang Sarak, Savadkuh, Mazandaran Province